The Journal of General Psychology is a quarterly peer-reviewed scientific journal covering experimental psychology. It was established in 1928 and is published by Routledge. The editors-in-chief are Paula Goolkasian (University of North Carolina, Charlotte) and David Trafimow (New Mexico State University). According to the Journal Citation Reports, the journal has a 2016 5-year impact factor of 0.612.

References

External links

List of issues on Taylor & Francis Online

Experimental psychology journals
Quarterly journals
Publications established in 1928
Routledge academic journals
English-language journals